The Pakistan Sikh Gurdwara Prabandhak Committee (or PSGPC) is a Sikh religious organisation in Pakistan. PSGPC was formed by the Government of Pakistan and is entrusted with the maintenance of Sikh religious institutions, places of worships in Pakistan.

History
Shiromani Gurdwara Prabandhak Committee (SGPC) was created in 1920s by struggle of Sikhs. After 1947 partition of Punjab, all religious properties of Sikhs came under Evacuee Trust Property Board. On 11 April 1999, Pakistan Sikh Gurudwara Prabandhak Committee was constituted under the ETPB chairmanship of ex-DG, ISI Lt. Gen. (Retd) Javed Nasir.

Location
Its main organisation is based in Lahore in the province of Punjab with Gurdwara Dera Sahib its headquarter.

Powers
The PSGPC is opposed by the Shiromani Gurdwara Prabandhak Committee (SGPC), which regards itself as the sole guardian of Sikh institutions and religion worldwide.  The right to sole guardian is given to SGPC every 4 years in a fair elections in which Sikhs from around the world participate. Unlike SGPC in India, PSGPC is not an Independent fully Sikh-owned body and is controlled by Evacuee Trust Property Board (ETPB) of Pakistan. Thirteen members are appointed by Government of Pakistan, and these then members elect the president and the secretary-general.

Functions
This organisation is entrusted with the maintenance of Sikh religious institutions, places of worships (gurdwara) and the well-being of the Pakistani Sikh community. It works to bring back sacred relics belonging to Sikhism at Gurudwaras.

See also
 Akali movement
 Shiromani Gurdwara Parbandhak Committee
 Delhi Sikh Gurdwara Management Committee
 Haryana Sikh Gurdwara Parbandhak Committee
 Pakistan Sikh Council
 Sikhism in Pakistan

References

External links
 Official Website
 PSGPC on Twitter
 Evacuee Trust Property Board website
 Ministry of Religious Affairs & Inter Faith Harmony

Sikhism in Pakistan
Religious organisations based in Pakistan
Sikh organisations
Pakistan federal departments and agencies
1999 establishments in Pakistan
Organizations established in 1999